Eleutherodactylus michaelschmidi, the Sierra Maestra blotched frog, is a species of frog endemic to Cuba. It is also called robber frog and rain frog. It has been classified as endangered on the IUCN Global Red List and as vulnerable on the IUCN National Red List for Cuba. It was last observed in 2007.

References

michaelschmidi
Amphibians of Cuba
Endemic fauna of Cuba
Amphibians described in 2007